Stephen Derek Keppler (born February 18, 1961) is an English-American professional golfer.

Keppler was born in London, England. He played college golf at Florida State University from 1980 to 1983, where he was a third-team All-American. Following his senior season, Keppler for Great Britain and Ireland in the 1983 Walker Cup.

He played on the European Tour in 1984 with little success, making only three cuts in 13 events. He later became a club professional at several clubs in Georgia. A four-time winner of the Georgia PGA Championship and two-time winner of the Georgia Open, Keppler had his PGA Tour highlight when he led the 1995 BellSouth Classic after three rounds, only to finish third.

As a senior, Keppler has qualified twice for the U.S. Senior Open.

In 2014, Keppler was inducted into the Georgia Golf Hall of Fame.

Professional wins
1990 Georgia PGA Championship
1994 Georgia Open, Georgia PGA Championship
1995 Georgia Open
1996 Georgia PGA Championship
2011 Georgia PGA Championship

Team appearances
Amateur
Jacques Léglise Trophy (representing Great Britain & Ireland): 1977, 1978
St Andrews Trophy (representing Great Britain & Ireland): 1982
Walker Cup (representing Great Britain & Ireland): 1983
European Amateur Team Championship (representing England): 1983

References

External links

Georgia Golf Hall of Fame

English male golfers
American male golfers
Florida State Seminoles men's golfers
European Tour golfers
Golfers from London
1961 births
Living people